Britannia refers to several places in Ontario:

 Britannia, Ottawa
 A community within Lake of Bays in Muskoka
 A former village now part of Mississauga